XHBB-FM 101.5/XEBB-AM 600 is a combo radio station in Acapulco, Guerrero. It is owned by Grupo ACIR and carries its La Comadre grupera format.

History
XEBB received its first concession on January 26, 1953. It was owned by Radio Acapulco, S.A. XEBB added its FM counterpart in 1994 and was consolidated into Radio Integral in 2000.

References

Radio stations in Guerrero
Radio stations established in 1953
Grupo ACIR